Folque is a Norwegian folk rock band founded in 1973 by Morten Bing, Jørn Jensen, Eilif Amundsen, Lisa Helljesen, Espen Løvstad, Trond Øverland, and Trond Villa. In 1972 a subset of the band was initially named «Brød & Vin» (Bread & wine), they changed the name to Folque in the spring of 1973 after adding members and traditional instruments to the ensemble.

The band was dissolved in 1984, but reunited in 1994 and in  2004 for playing live. Folque is re-established in 2014 with Lisa Helljesen as lead singer.

Their musical style is linked to Malicorne in France and to Steeleye Span in the UK.

Most of the discography is difficult to find, as only the first three albums were re-released on CD.

Discography 
 Folque (1974)
 Kjempene på Dovrefjell (1975)
 Vardøger (1977)
 Dans, dans Olav Liljekrans (1978)
 Folques beste (1979)
 Fredløs (1980)
 Landet ditt (1981)
 Sort messe (1983)
 Dans dans (1991)
 Stormkast (1998)

See also 
 Folk och Rackare

References

External links 
 Official homepage 
 MySpace page

Norwegian folk rock groups
Musical groups established in 1973
1973 establishments in Norway
Musical groups disestablished in 1984
1984 disestablishments in Norway
Musical groups from Norway with local place of origin missing